Yu Hsiu-chin (born 1 June 1990) is a Taiwanese female football and futsal player who plays as a striker.

International goals

References 

Living people
Taiwanese women's footballers
Footballers at the 2014 Asian Games
Taiwanese women's futsal players
1990 births
Footballers at the 2018 Asian Games
Women's association football forwards
Chinese Taipei women's international footballers
Asian Games competitors for Chinese Taipei